Jennifer Austin McLogan (born August 14, 1953), known professionally as Jennifer McLogan, is an American television news reporter.

Early life and education 

A native of Flint, Michigan, McLogan earned a Bachelor of Arts degree in English and theater from the University of Michigan, where she lettered in basketball, and a Master of Fine Arts degree from Brandeis University.

Professional career 

McLogan began her broadcasting career in Boston, first as a writer at WEEI-AM and then as a reporter for WHDH-AM.  She transitioned to television by joining WBZ-TV in Boston as a reporter.  In 1982, McLogan joined WCBS-TV in New York as a reporter.

In 1984, she became a correspondent for NBC News, where she worked for the next five years and reported for The NBC Nightly News, The Today Show, and NBC Sportsworld.

In 1989, she joined WBBM-TV in Chicago as a reporter.  She left WBBM in 1993, and rejoined WCBS-TV in New York, where she works to this day.  McLogan currently covers Long Island

McLogan has been recognized for her coverage of breaking news with her first-on-the-scene reports of the Long Island Railroad shooting, the crash of TWA flight 800, the Belle Harbor crash of American Airlines flight 587, the Philadelphia Police firebombing of the headquarters of the radical group MOVE, the death of Arthur Ashe, and the guilty verdict in the Long Island DWI "limo murder" trial. For her reporting, she has been the recipient of national and local Emmys as well as awards from the Associated Press, American Women in Radio and Television, and the Long Island Coalition for Fair Broadcasting.

Personal life
McLogan has been married to Daniel Gurskis, Dean of the College of the Arts at Montclair State University, since 1982.

References

External links 
 WCBS-TV Profile

Living people
American television reporters and correspondents
American women television journalists
Brandeis University alumni
1953 births
People from Flint, Michigan
People from Garden City, New York
University of Michigan alumni